Angela Robinson (born February 14, 1971) is an American film and television director, screenwriter and producer. Outfest Fusion LGBTQ People of Color Film Festival awarded Robinson with the Fusion Achievement Award in 2013 for her contribution to LGBTQ+ media visibility.

Early life
Robinson was born in Chicago. Robinson attended Brown University, where she majored in theatre and later received an MFA from New York University.

Career
Robinson frequently deals with gay and lesbian topics in her films.
Angela Robinson's first screen work was a black and white film, Chickulal Teenage Vampire about a queer vampire. The film was shown at LGBTQ film festivals in 1995.

Films

D.E.B.S 
She directed the short film D.E.B.S. (2003), produced by POWER UP. The short film has won four awards which includes the Bearfest-Big Bear Lake International Film Festival Jury Award for Best Short Film, the PlanetOut Short Movie Awards Grand Prize, the Philadelphia International Gay & Lesbian Film Festival Jury Prize for Best Lesbian Short Film and New York Lesbian and Gay Film Festival Award for Best Short. Robinson went on to direct a feature-length adaptation of D.E.B.S. (2004). D.E.B.S feature-film adaption (2004) is a lesbian romantic comedy about a "spy-in training Amy Bradshaw and a supervillian Lucy Diamond. Amy is assigned to go after Lucy. However, Amy starts to develop feelings for her." D.E.B.S has made a big impact in queer cinema. Senior entertainment writer named Adam Vary described D.E.B.S as "the gay spy movie" in his article "The New New Queer Cinema". Writer Katrin Horn remarked that D.E.B.S is a groundbreaking movie as the film works to desexualize femme identity previously centered in lesbian chic cinema. Robinson's use of narrative and stylistic techniques in D.E.B.S offered a new lenses into lesbian representations and the structure of heteronormative romantic comedies.

Girltrash! 
In 2007, Robinson created the online series Girltrash! for OurChart, a social networking website aimed primarily at lesbians. In 2014, Robinson wrote the screenplay for a musical feature film and prequel to her Girltrash! series, Girltrash: All Night Long directed by Alexandra Kondracke. Robinson was also one of the producers for the film. The film is a lesbian musical drama about two rock and roll musicians named Daisy and Tyler during a night out in the LGBTQ+ subculture of Los Angeles. The film won the audience award in the 2015 Paris International Lesbian and Feminist Film Festival.

Professor Marston and the Wonder Women 
Robinson wrote and directed the film Professor Marston and the Wonder Women that was released in 2017. The film focuses on William Moulton Marston, an Harvard educated psychologist who created Wonder Woman in the 1940's. Marston's received help from his wife Elizabeth and Olive Byrne, a research assistant, in his creation of the super heroine. The movie also includes the polyamorous relationship Marston, Elizabeth and Olive were in and how that effected their careers and lives.

Stranger In Paradise 
In 2017, Robinson worked with cartoonist Terry Moore on a graphic novel adaptation of "Strangers in Paradise" for a feature film.

Television shows

The L Word 
In 2004, Robinson wrote, produced and directed episodes from the show The L Word. The show is about the lives of a group of lesbian and bisexual friends in Los Angeles. Media critic, Samuel A. Chambers argues that the "L Word" importance is that the show brought a lot of visibility to a range of lesbian and bisexual identities in its character plot lines. Also, many of the guest casts on the show were queer actresses in Hollywood like Jane Lynch and Sandra Bernhard. In 2006, the show won the 17th annual GLAAD Media award. The award recognizes and honors inclusive representations of LGBTQ+ people and issues that impact them.

True Blood 

Robinson has served as a writer for the television series True Blood. True Blood is an American fantasy drama about Sookie Stackhouse, a telepathic waitress, who lives in a rural town in Louisiana. The waitress falls in love with Bill Compton, a vampire, and the two must navigate the challenges that come with their relationship. The fictional show also focuses on vampires' struggle for rights and assimilation in society.

Other works 
Robinson has also served as writer and co-executive producer for the HBO television series Hung,  
In addition to her film and TV work, Robinson also wrote the first four issues of the Web ongoing series at DC Comics.

In March 2012, it was announced that Robinson would write a supernatural teen thriller with Dawn Olmstead (of Prison Break) and Marti Noxon (of Mad Men) attached as producers.

More recently in 2021, Robinson signed an overall deal with Warner Bros. to create scripted television programs for Warner Bros platforms including HBOMax, basic and premium cable channels and broadcast networks.

At Warner Bros., Robinson is currently working as writer and executive producer with HBOMax to develop a series based on Madame X, a DC Comics characters also known as Madame Xanadu. Madame X is a clairvoyant who uses tarot cards to tell the future and is immortal due to her deal with Death. The series will be produced by Bad Robot in association with Warner Bros. Television.

Personal life
Robinson is openly lesbian. Her partner is television writer and director Alexandra "Alex" Martinez Kondracke, the daughter of Morton Kondracke, who she met while they were both studying at New York University. Alexandria Martinez Kondracke is an activist and filmmaker. In 2009, Kondracke gave birth to their first child, Diego. They live in Los Feliz, California.

Filmography

Film

Television

See also 
 List of female film and television directors
 List of lesbian filmmakers
 List of LGBT-related films directed by women

References

External links
 
 UltimateDisney.com Interview - October 2005
 Article on AfterEllen
 Column by Angela Robinson on "Why We Don't Need the Man"
 

1971 births
Living people
American film editors
American film producers
American television directors
American television writers
American women film directors
American women film producers
American women screenwriters
African-American film directors
African-American screenwriters
African-American television directors
American lesbian artists
American lesbian writers
LGBT film directors
LGBT television directors
LGBT producers
American LGBT screenwriters
LGBT African Americans
American women film editors
American women television directors
American women television producers
American women television writers
Film producers from California
Screenwriters from California
Television producers from California
Film directors from Los Angeles
Writers from Los Angeles
Film directors from San Francisco
Writers from San Francisco
LGBT people from Illinois
Screenwriters from Illinois
Writers from Chicago
Brown University alumni
New York University alumni
21st-century African-American people
21st-century African-American women
People from Los Feliz, Los Angeles
20th-century African-American people
21st-century American LGBT people
20th-century African-American women
African-American women writers